Cephaloscypha is a fungal genus  in the family Marasmiaceae. This is a monotypic genus, containing the single species Cephaloscypha morlichensis. The genus and species were described by mycologist Reinhard Agerer in 1975.

See also

 List of Agaricales genera
 List of Marasmiaceae genera

References

External links
 

Marasmiaceae
Monotypic Agaricales genera